Candace Groth Fleming  (born May 24, 1962) is an American writer of children's books, both fiction and non-fiction.

Candace Groth was born in Michigan City, Indiana. She married Scott Fleming. From 1997 to 2005, she was a teacher at William Rainey Harper College near Chicago. Since that time, she has worked full-time as a writer, educator, and speaker.

Her first picture book Professor Fergus Fahrenheit and his Wonderful Weather Machine was published by Simon & Schuster in 1994 as written by "Candace Groth-Fleming" and illustrated by Don Weller. Subsequent publications have all appeared under the name Candace Fleming.

Fleming is the author of more than twenty books for children and young adults, including the Los Angeles Times Book Prize honored The Family Romanov: Murder, Rebellion, and the Fall of the Russian Empire; Boston Globe/Horn Book Award-winning biography, The Lincolns; the bestselling picture book, Muncha! Muncha! Muncha!; and the beloved Boxes for Katje.  The bibliography below lists each of her published works.

Selected awards
Los Angeles Times Book Prize for Young Adult Literature for The Family Romanov: Murder, Rebellion, and the Fall of Imperial Russia (2014) 
NCTE Orbis Pictus Award for The Family Romanov: Murder, Rebellion, and the Fall of Imperial Russia (2014) 
Boston Globe–Horn Book Award for nonfiction for The Family Romanov: Murder, Rebellion, and the Fall of Imperial Russia (2014) 
Boston Globe–Horn Book Award for The Lincolns (2009) 
Golden Kite Award for Amelia Lost: The Life And Disappearance Of Amelia Earhart (2012) 
Children’s Book Guild Nonfiction Award (2014) 
California Young Reader Medal for Boxes for Katje (2006)
YALSA-ALA Excellence in Young Adult Nonfiction" winner, 2020.

Bibliography

Picture BooksProfessor Ferguson Fahrenheit and his Wonderful Weather Machine (1994)Women of the Lights (1995), illustrated by James WatlingMadame LaGrande and Her So High, to the Sky, Uproarious Pompadour (1996), illustrated by S.D. SchindlerGabriella's Song (1997), illustrated by Giselle PotterWestward Ho, Carlotta! (1997), illustrated by David CatrowThe Hatmaker's Sign (1998), illustrated by Robert A. ParkerWhen Agnes Caws (1999), illustrated by Giselle PotterA Big Cheese for the White House: The True Tale of a Tremendous Cheddar (1999), illustrated by S.D. SchindlerWho Invited You? (2001), illustrated by George BoothMuncha! Muncha! Muncha! (2002), illustrated by G. Brian KarasBoxes for Katje (2003), illustrated by Stacey Dressen-McQueenSmile, Lily! (2004), illustrated by Yumi HeoGator Gumbo: A Spicy-Hot Tale (2004), illustrated by Sally Anne LambertThis Is the Baby (2004), illustrated by Maggie SmithSunny Boy!: The Life and Times of a Tortoise (2005), illustrated by Anne Wilsdorf
Tippy-Tippy-TippyTippy-Tippy-Tippy, Hide! (2007), illustrated by G. Brian KarasTippy-Tippy-Tippy, Splash! (2014), illustrated by G. Brian KarasImogene's Last Stand (2009), illustrated by Nancy CarpenterSeven Hungry Babies (2010), illustrated by Eugene YelchinClever Jack Takes the Cake (2010), illustrated by G. Brian KarasOh, No! (2012), illustrated by Eric Rohmann  Papa's Mechanical Fish (2013), illustrated by Boris Kolikov
BulldozerBulldozer's Big Day (2015), illustrated by Eric RohmannBulldozer Helps Out (2017), illustrated by Eric RohmannGo Sleep In Your Own Bed! (2017), illustrated by Lori NicholsEmma's Circus (2017), illustrated by Christine DavenierThe Amazing Collection of Joey Cornell (2018), illustrated by Gérard DuBois

Fiction
Aesop ElementaryThe Fabled Fourth Graders of Aesop Elementary School (2005)The Fabled Fifth Graders of Aesop Elementary School (2010)Lowji Discovers America (2005)On the Day I Died: Stories from the Grave (2010)
 History PalsBen Franklin's in My Bathroom! (2017), illustrated by Marc FearingEleanor Roosevelt's in My Garage! (2018), illustrated by Marc FearingStrongheart: Wonder Dog of the Silver Screen (2018), illustrated by Eric Rohmann

Non-fictionBen Franklin's Almanac: Being a True Account of the Good Gentleman's Life (2003)Our Eleanor: A Scrapbook Look at Eleanor Roosevelt's Remarkable Life (2005)The Lincolns: A Scrapbook Look at Abraham and Mary (2008) The Great and Only Barnum: The Tremendous, Stupendous Life of Showman P. T. Barnum (2009)Amelia Lost: The Life and Disappearance of Amelia Earhart (2011)The Family Romanov: Murder, Rebellion, and the Fall of Imperial Russia (2014)Presenting Buffalo Bill: The Man Who Invented the Wild West (2016)Giant Squid(2016), illustrated by Eric RohmannThe Rise and Fall of Charles Lindbergh (2020)

AnthologiesGuys Read True Stories (2014) edited by Jon Scieszka. Contributed “A Jumbo Story” about Jumbo the elephant. Our Story Begins: your favorite authors and illustrators share fun, inspiring, and occasionally ridiculous things they wrote and drew as kids (2017) edited by Elissa Brent Weissman.Fatal Throne: The Wives of Henry VIII Tell All'' (2018) concept by Candace Fleming. Written by M.T. Anderson (Henry VIII), Candace Fleming (Katharine of Aragon), Stephanie Hemphill (Anne Boleyn), Lisa Ann Sandell (Jane Seymour), Jennifer Donnelly (Anna of Cleves), Linda Sue Park (Catherine Howard), and Deborah Hopkinson (Kateryn Parr).

References

External links
 
 Candace Fleming on PBS LearningMedia
 
 Princeton University, Cotsen Children's Library
 Reading Rockets interview

American non-fiction writers
American children's writers
Living people
1962 births
American women children's writers
American women non-fiction writers
21st-century American women
Robert F. Sibert Informational Book Medal winners